Ihova is a settlement in the Slovene Hills in the Municipality of Benedikt in northeastern Slovenia. The area is part of the traditional region of Styria. It is now included in the Drava Statistical Region.

Remains of a Roman villa rustica have been identified near the settlement.

References

External links
Ihova at Geopedia

Populated places in the Municipality of Benedikt